Marano Vicentino is a town and comune in the province of Vicenza, Veneto, Italy. It is south of Viale Europa.

Sources

(Google Maps)

Cities and towns in Veneto